Valdez-Yukon Railroad was an early 20th century railway in the U.S. state of Alaska, built subsequent to the Klondike Gold Rush. The Valdez-Yukon Railroad Company was organized in 1905 for the purpose of building a railroad from Valdez to Eagle City, and to tap the rich copper and gold districts of the Copper, Chitina, and Tanana rivers. The line was discontinued after reaching Keystone Canyon.

History
The surveyed route was conceded by railroad and transportation experts, including the military engineers for the United States government, to be the shortest and most feasible route to the interior of Alaska and the Yukon River, and President Theodore Roosevelt, in his message to the U.S. Congress in December, 1904 recommended government aid for a railroad over this route. The total length of the road was projected to be . In October 1905, the authorized capital stock of the Valdez-Yukon Railroad Company was $10,000,000; par value of the shares $100 each. Ten miles of  roadbed was graded by this time. The company expected to complete  by spring. The company stated that it had the first right by pre-emption through the canyon which must be traversed by any railroad building from Valdez to the Yukon. After reaching Keystone Canyon, the line was discontinued.

People
The engineer In charge was Alexander W. Swanitz. The officers and directors of the company included several leading bankers, manufacturers and business men. The law firm of Gifford, Hobbs, Haskell & Beard of New York City provided legal representation.

Further reading
Valdez-Yukon Railroad Company, J. A. Ferson, Edward Gillette, Oliver P. Hubbard (1902). Reports on the Proposed Railroad from Valdez to Eagle City, Alaska

References

External links
 Valdez-Yukon Railroad Company, 1906
 Valdez-Yukon Railroad Company Collection at Dartmouth College Library

See also

 White Pass and Yukon Route
 Alaska Railroad
 Klondike Mines Railway

1905 establishments in Alaska
Defunct Alaska railroads
Klondike Gold Rush
Industrial railroads in the United States
Narrow gauge railways in Yukon
Alaska Railroad